William Wray may refer to:

People
Sir William Wray, 1st Baronet, of Glentworth (c. 1555–1617), English politician
Sir William Wray, 1st Baronet, of Ashby (1625–1669), English politician
William Wray (artist) (born 1956), American cartoonist and landscape painter
William Fitzwater Wray (died 1938), cycling journalist
William Wray (politician) (1876–1946), American politician in the state of Washington
William J. Wray (1845-1919), American soldier and Medal of Honor recipient
Bill Wray, American musician, composer and producer

Other uses
Sir William Wray (song), by The Fall

See also
William Ray (disambiguation)
William Rae (disambiguation)